Alphonse Roy (October 26, 1897 – October 5, 1967) was a U.S. Representative from New Hampshire.

Born in Saint-Simon, Quebec, Canada, Roy moved to Manchester, New Hampshire, in 1901. He attended the parochial schools, then engaged in the real estate business.

Roy served as alderman for the city of Manchester, 1925–1931, and served as member of the New Hampshire House of Representatives, 1925–1931. He served on the Executive Council of New Hampshire, 1933–1937.

He successfully contested as a Democrat the election of Arthur B. Jenks to the Seventy-fifth Congress and served from June 9, 1938, to January 3, 1939. Roy was an unsuccessful candidate for reelection in 1938 to the Seventy-sixth Congress and for election in 1940 to the Seventy-seventh Congress.

Roy was appointed sealer of weights and measures of Manchester in 1943 and served until his resignation in 1945. He ran unsuccessfully in the 1953 Manchester mayoral election. He was United States marshal for the district of New Hampshire, 1945–1953. He was an unsuccessful candidate for election in 1958 to the Eighty-sixth Congress and an unsuccessful candidate for nomination for the United States Senate in 1960.

He engaged in the real estate business until his death in Manchester, October 5, 1967. He was interred in Mount Calvary Cemetery.

References

1897 births
1967 deaths
United States Marshals
Democratic Party members of the New Hampshire House of Representatives
Canadian emigrants to the United States
Politicians from Manchester, New Hampshire
American real estate businesspeople
Members of the Executive Council of New Hampshire
People from Montérégie
Democratic Party members of the United States House of Representatives from New Hampshire
20th-century American politicians